Miarmy is a crowd simulation plugin for Autodesk Maya to render scenes consisting of multiple moving individuals, or entities. The plugin is developed by Basefount Software, based in Hong Kong

Miarmy is used by a sevral major studios, including Dexter Digital, Disney Television Animation, Square Enix, Prasad EFX, CGCG Inc., Digital Frontiers, and Iloura.

Miarmy Express and Miarmy Professional

Miarmy is available in two versions: Express (free) and Professional (paid).  Sets of preset agents including models, textures, actions, and PhysX dynamic simulation are available for both versions for the following scenes:

 Stadium
 Ambient locomotion
 Ancient battle

Miarmy Express has the same feature set as the Professional version; however, its license is limited to non-commercial use and it only allows 100 agents to be rendered.

Release History
 Miarmy was first announced in a post on the AutoDesk forums on June 23, 2011.
 Miarmy 1.0 (June 22, 2011)
 Miarmy 1.1 (October 25, 2011)
 Miarmy 1.2 (February 14, 2012)
 Miarmy 1.5 (July 28, 2012)
 Miarmy 1.7 (November 8, 2012)
 Miarmy 2.0 (February 18, 2013)
 Miarmy 2.2 (May 4, 2013)
 Miarmy 2.5 (August 5, 2013)
 Miarmy 2.7 (December 11, 2013)

See also
Crowd simulation
List of Maya plugins

References

3D graphics software
Animation software
Agent-based model
2011 software
Cinematic techniques
Visual effects software